Iltasadum of Kish was the twenty-first Sumerian king in the First Dynasty of Kish, according to the Sumerian King List. His name does not appear in Early Dynastic inscriptions, meaning that he is unlikely to have been a real historical person.

References 

|-

Kings of Kish
Sumerian kings